Willy Tsao is a Chinese modern dance choreographer. He runs three major modern dance companies in China. He is the Founder and Artistic Director of City Contemporary Dance Company (Hong Kong) and BeijingDance / LDTX, as well as the Managing Director of Guangdong Modern Dance Company.

References

External links
Willy Tsao - forerunner of Chinese modern dance (Cultural China)
 Willy Tsao and his modern dancers of Beijing and Hong Kong steer clear of cultural expectations.(LA Times)
Willy Tsao conducts modern dance master class at Tongji University (Hong Kong at World Expo 2010)

Chinese choreographers
Hong Kong male dancers
Living people
Place of birth missing (living people)
Year of birth missing (living people)
Hong Kong art directors